Camden Town, often shortened to Camden, is an area in the London Borough of Camden, around  north of Charing Cross. Historically in Middlesex, it is the administrative centre of the borough and identified in the London Plan as one of 34 major centres in Greater London.

Laid out as a residential district from 1791 and originally part of the manor of Kentish Town and the parish of St Pancras, Camden Town became an important location during the early development of the railways, which reinforced its position on the London canal network. The area's industrial economic base has been replaced by service industries such as retail, tourism and entertainment. The area now hosts street markets and music venues that are strongly associated with alternative culture.

History

Toponymy
Camden Town is named after Charles Pratt, 1st Earl Camden. His earldom was styled after his estate, Camden Place near Chislehurst in Kent (now in the London Borough of Bromley), formerly owned by historian William Camden. The name, which appears on the Ordnance Survey map of 1822, was later applied to the early-20th-century Camden Town Group of artists and the London Borough of Camden, created in 1965.

Urban development
The emergence of the industrial revolution in the 19th century meant Camden was the  North Western Railway's terminal stop in 1837. It was where goods were transported off the tracks and onto the roads of London by 250 000 workhorses. The whole area was adapted to a transportation function: The Roundhouse (1846), Camden Lock and The Stables were examples of this.

Camden Town stands on land that was once the manor of Kentish Town. Sir Charles Pratt, a radical 18th-century lawyer and politician, acquired the manor through marriage. In 1791, he started granting leases for houses to be built in the manor. In 1816, the Regent's Canal was built through the area. Up to at least the mid-20th century, Camden Town was considered an "unfashionable" locality. The Camden Markets, which started in 1973 and have grown since then, attract many visitors. A 1993 bomb blast injured 18 people on Camden High Street. On 9 February 2008, Camden Canal market suffered a major fire, but there were no injuries. It later reopened as Camden Lock Village, until closed in 2015 for redevelopment.

Governance
Camden Town was contained within the Metropolitan Borough of St Pancras between 1900 and 1965, when it became part of the new London Borough of Camden, of which it is the namesake and administrative centre.

Political constituencies

Camden Town is contained in the following political constituencies for different purposes, listed with some incumbents :
Camden London Borough Council: London Borough of Camden. 55 councillors, Labour control
The Camden Town ward, created in 2020, returns two borough councillors.
UK Parliament: Holborn and St Pancras. Keir Starmer, Labour Party
London Assembly: Barnet and Camden. Anne Clarke, Labour Party

Geography
To the north are the hills of Hampstead and Highgate; to the west is Primrose Hill. The culverted, subterranean River Fleet flows from its source on Hampstead Heath through Camden Town south to the River Thames. The Regent's Canal runs through the north of Camden Town.

Economy

At the end of the 20th century, entertainment-related businesses began moving into the area, and a Holiday Inn was built abutting the canal. A number of retail and food chain outlets replaced independent shops, driven out by high rents and redevelopment. Restaurants with a variety of culinary traditions thrived, many of them near the markets, on Camden High Street and its side streets, Parkway, Chalk Farm Road, and Bayham Street. The plan to redevelop the historic Stables Market led to a steel and glass extension, built on the edges of the site in 2006, and increased the market's capacity.

Camden street markets

Camden is well known for its markets. These date from 1974 or later, except for Inverness Street market, for over a century a small food market serving the local community, though by 2013 all foodstuff and produce stalls had gone and only touristy stalls remained. Camden Lock Market proper started in a former timber yard in 1973, and is now surrounded by five more markets: Buck Street market, Stables market, Camden Lock Village, and an indoor market in the Electric Ballroom. The markets are a major tourist attraction at weekends, selling goods of all types, including fashion, lifestyle, books, food, junk/antiques and more bizarre items; they and the surrounding shops are popular with young people, in particular, those searching for "alternative" clothing. While originally open on Sundays only, market activity later extended throughout the week, though concentrating on weekends.

Transport

London Underground
Camden Town tube station is near the markets and other attractions.  and  tube stations are also within walking distance. Camden Town station is a key interchange station for the Bank and Charing Cross branches of the southbound Northern line, and the Edgware and High Barnet branches of the northbound Northern Line.

The station was not designed to cope with the volume of traffic it handled after the area increased in popularity with the introduction of the markets. The narrow platforms became dangerously overcrowded, particularly on Sunday afternoons. London Underground made many proposals to upgrade the station. In 2004 a proposal requiring the compulsory purchase and demolition of 'the Triangle'—land bordered by Kentish Town Road, Buck Street and Camden High Street—was rejected by Camden Council after opposition from local people; of 229 letters, only two supported the scheme. It was later planned to redevelop the station entirely between 2020 and 2024/5, with less demolition than proposed previously, but the redevelopment was postponed in December 2018 by TfL "until we have the funds we need", unchanged .

Early in the 21st century the station closed to outbound passengers on Sunday afternoons for safety reasons; this was temporarily extended to the weekday evening rush hour in 2018 during escalator renovation. Mornington Crescent, Chalk Farm, and Kentish Town stations, within walking distance, remained open. From January 2019 access was allowed on Sundays, but only by a very long spiral staircase instead of escalators. During the Covid-19 pandemic from 2020, access to the very much reduced number of passengers was no longer restricted.

Rail
 is a London Overground station at the corner of Royal College Street and Camden Road. It is on the line from Richmond in the West to Stratford station in the East. The nearest National Rail station is  station on the Thameslink route on the Midland Main Line. St Pancras and Euston terminals are both within 20 minutes' walk of Camden Town.

Bus routes
The area is a major hub for London Buses. The following routes serve Camden Town: 24 (24 hour), 27, 29, 31, 46, 88 (24 hour), 134 (24 hour), 168, 214 (24 hour), 253, 274 and Night Bus Routes N5, N20, N27, N28, N29, N31, N253 and N279.

Roads

Parts of the A503 (Camden Road) and A400 (Camden High Street and Camden Street) are designated as red routes on which vehicles may not stop for any reason, managed by Transport for London (TfL) rather than the borough. Black taxis ply for hire in the area and there are minicab offices.

During the COVID-19 pandemic, from about March 2020 roadworks were carried out to make many side roads more suitable for cycling and reduce vehicle traffic. This led to traffic jams described as "gridlock", and opposition.

Cycling 
Transport for London and Camden Council both provide and maintain cycling infrastructure in Camden Town. Segregated cycle tracks run alongside Royal College Street to the east of Camden Town, past Camden Road railway station. Cycling provision changes from time to time—in particular, cycling provisions were added during the Covid pandemic that started in 2020. Current provision information is on the TfL Web site. The CycleStreets mobile app finds suitable routes throughout the UK, including Camden Town.

The Regent's Canal towpath is a shared-use path maintained by the Canal and River Trust. The towpath links Camden Town to Angel and King's Cross to the east, and Regent's Park and Maida Vale in the west.

The London-wide Santander Cycles cycle hire scheme operates in Camden Town. There are several docking stations, including at Camden Road railway station (Bonny Street) and Camden Town tube station (Greenland Road).

Cycle counters on Royal College Street to the north of Camden Road railway station recorded over 375,000 journeys between August 2017 and July 2018.

Regent's Canal

Regent's Canal runs through the north end of Camden Town. Canal boat trips along the canal from Camden Lock are popular, particularly in summer. Many of the handrails by the bridges show deep marks worn by the towropes by which horses pulled canal barges until the 1950s, and it is still possible to see ramps on the canal bank designed to assist horses that fell in the canal after being startled by the noise of a train. Camden Lock is a regularly used traditional manually operated double canal lock operating between widely separated levels. A large complex of weekend street markets operates around the Lock. The towpath is a pedestrian and cycle route which runs continuously from Little Venice through Camden Lock to the Islington Tunnel. A regular waterbus service operates along the Regent's Canal from Camden Lock. Boats depart every hour during the summer, heading westward around Regent's Park, calling at London Zoo and on towards Maida Vale. Sightseeing narrow-boat trips run from Camden Lock to Little Venice.

Notable places

The Roundhouse is a former locomotive roundhouse constructed in 1847 for the London and North Western Railway. It later had various uses, including a corn and potato store, Gilbey's gin warehouse, and eventually became derelict until it was converted to a theatre, arts centre and music venue in 1966, later closed, and reopened in 2006 as a theatre and music venue.
Camden Catacombs (see also Catacombs of London), not true catacombs but an underground area largely underneath the Camden markets, originally used as stables for horses and pit ponies used to shunt railway wagons. Not open to visitors due to danger of flooding.
St Pancras Old Church
Our Lady of Hal, Catholic church for the area
The Camden Eye at 2 Kentish Town Road, was formerly known and as the Old Mother Red Cap, the Red Cap and Halfway House. It was also used as a prison.
St Michael's Church, Camden Town
Greater London House, formerly the Carreras Cigarette Factory and now offices housing several companies, a striking Art Deco Egyptian Revival building dating from 1926 to 1928, stands at Mornington Crescent and is distinguished by a pair of -high bronze statues of the Egyptian cat goddess Bastet.
Jewish Museum London
The Royal Veterinary College on Royal College Street. Founded in 1791, the veterinary school is the oldest and largest in the UK.
Arlington House, originally one of the Rowton Houses providing low-cost overnight accommodation, now housing a conference centre but still providing low-cost rooms and flats.
 The unusual Sainsbury's supermarket and flats on Camden Road were designed in a high-tech style by Nicholas Grimshaw and built on the site of the former large ABC Bakery.
 The Hawley Arms is a pub and music venue which became well known in the 90s as a hub for the indie and alternative music scene in London. It was Amy Winehouse's favourite pub when she lived in Camden Town, and she was rumoured to get behind the bar to pull pints and serve drinks.

Camden Highline

A new park and walkway utilising the former railway alignment between Camden Town and Kings Cross was given planning permssion in January 2023.

Notable people

 B. R. Ambedkar (social reformer, jurist and LSE graduate) lived at 10, King Henry Road, Camden Town, now known as Ambedkar House, in 1921 and 1922.
Richard Ryan lived in Camden Town from 1819 until his death in 1849.
Charles Dickens's second London home was in Bayham Street in 1822. He later moved to 112 Little College Street (now College Place), where he boarded with Elizabeth Roylance, a family friend, whom Dickens later immortalised as "Mrs. Pipchin" in Dombey and Son.
Beryl Bainbridge lived in Albert Street from the 1960s until her death in 2010.
Playwright Alan Bennett lived in Gloucester Crescent for many years. Margaret Fairchild (aka Miss Shepherd) lived in a van on his driveway.
Actress and dancer Louisa Lytton was born & raised in Camden Town.
Physicist, mathematician, and engineer Oliver Heaviside was born in Camden Town.
Author and journalist Bernard Levin grew up in Camden Town's Plender Street.
Boxer Tom Sayers lived in Camden, and died at No. 257 Camden High Street in 1865. The house now has a plaque.
Painter Walter Sickert lived and worked as part of the Camden Town Group in Mornington Crescent. In 1908 he painted a group of four paintings collectively titled The Camden Town Murder, in reference to the notorious Camden Town Murder case of 1907.
Poet Dylan Thomas owned a house at 54 Delancey Street from 1951 until his death in 1953. There is a plaque on the house today.
Singer Amy Winehouse lived in Camden Town, first on Prowse Place and then on Camden Square, where she was found dead in July 2011. Winehouse was strongly associated with Camden Town. Since her death she has been entitled as "The Queen of Camden" and a bronze statue of her was placed in Stables Market on what would have been her 31st birthday, 14 September 2014.
Hip-hop trio N-Dubz are from and grew up in the area.
Music Band Madness are from and grew up in Camden Town and surrounding areas.
Singer Eliza Doolittle grew up in the area.
Jazz Musician Nubya Garcia was born and grew up Camden Town.
Actor Freddie Highmore was born in Camden Town in 1992.
Dancer and actress Donna King teaches at her studio in Camden Town.
Journalist and novelist Sean Thomas lives in Camden.
Songwriter and singer Dua Lipa grew up in Camden until she moved to Kosovo.
Ashley Keane, former professional footballer for Torquay United F.C., was born in Camden in 1981.
Drag queen Lady Camden was born in Camden before moving to California in 2020.

Media

National

To the north of Camden Town station and running along the canal is a modern pop art complex designed by Terry Farrell as the studios of the former TV-am, now used by MTV but retaining TV-am's eggcup sculptures along the roof line. Associated Press Television News has its head office in a former gin warehouse near Camden Lock called "The Interchange".

Local
The Camden New Journal is a free, independent weekly newspaper that covers the London Borough of Camden.

Camden tv, Web site with short films about Camden.

In popular culture

In literature
Author Charles Dickens, a onetime resident of Camden Town, placed various characters and places in his stories there as well: Bob Cratchit's family in A Christmas Carol (1843); the Micawbers in David Copperfield (1850); and in Dombey and Son (1846–1848), a description of the building of the London and Birmingham Railway, includes a trip through Camden Town.
E. Nesbit's 1904 children's novel The Phoenix and the Carpet is set at 18 Camden Terrace, Camden Town.
John Betjeman's poem "Business Girls" is set in Camden Town.
The climax of John le Carré's 1974 spy novel Tinker Tailor Soldier Spy occurs in a safe house at 5 Lock Gardens in Camden Town, a fictitious address modelled after real-life St. Mark's Crescent.

In film and television
The 1986 cult comedy film Withnail and I is set in Camden Town in 1969.
The 1989 comedy film The Tall Guy stars Jeff Goldblum as the titular protagonist, who we frequently see bicycling to his flat set in Camden Town.
The 2008 Mike Leigh film Happy-Go-Lucky largely takes place in Camden Town.
The 2015 film The Lady in the Van tells the story of a homeless woman who parked her van in Alan Bennett's Camden driveway (in Gloucester Crescent) and lived there for 15 years.
The 2015 film Amy, the documentary based on Amy Winehouse's life and death features footage and exclusive images of Winehouse in Camden during her life.
 The 2018 film Been So Long is set in Camden Town.
The 2019 Disney animated series 101 Dalmatian Street is set in Camden Town.
In Call of Duty: Modern Warfare (2019), a mission named "Clean House" is set in Camden Town.
The second season of Peaky Blinders (2 October 2014) refers to Camden Town Gangs.

In music
The song "You Just Can't Win" by Them from the album The Angry Young Them references Camden Town (1965)
The song "Camden Town" by Suggs (1995)
The song "Come back to Camden" by Morrissey from the album You Are the Quarry (2004)
The song "Johnny Come Lately" by Steve Earle from the album Copperhead Road, 1988
The song "Guided Tour of Camden" by Charlie Sloth, 2007
The song "Ladykillers" by Lush, 1996
The song "Fame and Fortune" By The Libertines from the album Anthems for Doomed Youth
The song "How Did It Come to This" by Take That from the album The Circus makes a small reference to Camden Town
The song "So Close" by Matthew Good from the album Arrows of Desire mentions Camden High Street
The song "Sorted for E's & Wizz" by Pulp from the album Different Class mentions Camden Town
The song "One Better Day" by Madness refers to Arlington House, a hostel for the homeless in Camden Town
The song "London Boy" by Taylor Swift refers to her enjoyment of "walking Camden Market in the afternoon"
The song "Five Get Over Excited" by The Housemartins from the album The People Who Grinned Themselves to Death, 1987
The song "London Belongs To Me" by Saint Etienne from the album Foxbase Alpha references Camden Town (1991)
The song "London" by Mokita references Camden Town (2018)

In games
Camden Town is featured in the fifth campaign level of Call of Duty: Modern Warfare, involving a team of the Special Air Service led by Captain Price raiding a townhouse filled with Al-Qatala affiliates.

References

Bibliography

External links

 Camden Town London website – News about the Camden Markets and Camden Town
 Camden Town Online – The original Camden Town website, est. 1996

 
Areas of London
Districts of the London Borough of Camden
Major centres of London
Business improvement districts in London
Restaurant districts and streets in England
Places formerly in Middlesex